Palácio da Justiça may refer to:

 Palácio da Justiça (Porto)
 Palácio da Justiça (Coimbra)